Ar Khi Sar is a Burmese politician  who currently serves as a Kachin State Hluttaw MP for Kawnglanghpu Township No.2. He is a member of the National League for Democracy.

Political career
He is a member of the National League for Democracy. In the 2015 Myanmar general election and 2020 Myanmar general election, he was elected as an Kachin State Hluttaw MP, and elected representative from  Kawnglanghpu Township No.2 parliamentary constituency.

References

National League for Democracy politicians
1981 births
Living people